Mashahir (also Romanized as Mashāhīr; also known as Mashīr, and Mesheir) is a village in Arzil Rural District, Kharvana District, Varzaqan County, East Azerbaijan Province, Iran. At the 2006 census, its population was 197, in 53 families.

References 

Towns and villages in Varzaqan County

Dr samad jafari mashahir is a son of mashahir district